Stade de l'Amitie or Friendship Stadium is a multi-purpose stadium in Cotonou, Benin.  It is currently used for football matches and also has facilities for athletics.  The stadium has a capacity of 20,000 people.

The stadium is home to Benin's national football team.

References

External links
Photo at cafe.daum.net/stade
Photo at worldstadiums.com

Sports venues in Benin
Athletics (track and field) venues in Benin
Football venues in Benin
Benin
Buildings and structures in Cotonou
Multi-purpose stadiums